This is a summary of 1956 in music in the United Kingdom, including the official charts from that year.

Events
 February – Release of Shirley Bassey's first single, Burn My Candle (At Both Ends).
8 May – Benjamin Britten's opera Gloriana, written in 1953, is given its US première in Cincinnati, in concert form, conducted by Josef Krips.
14 May – Ralph Vaughan Williams's Symphony No. 8 receives its first London performance.
June – Arthur Bliss heads the first delegation by British musicians to the Soviet Union since the end of the Second World War. The party included the violinist Alfredo Campoli, the oboist Léon Goossens, the soprano Jennifer Vyvyan and the pianist Gerald Moore.
13 November – The first of a series of Hoffnung Music Festival Concerts takes place at the Royal Festival Hall, in London.
31 December – Flanders and Swann launch their two-man revue At the Drop of a Hat.

Charts
See UK No.1 Hits of 1956

Classical music: new works
Arthur Bliss
Edinburgh Overture, for orchestra
Seek the Lord (anthem), SATB choir and organ
Reginald Smith Brindle – El Polifemo de Oro
Benjamin Britten
Antiphon, Op. 56b, for SATB choir and organ
The Prince of the Pagodas, Op. 57 (ballet in three acts)
Peter Maxwell Davies – Sonata for Clarinet and Piano
Stephen Dodgson – Concerto No. 1 for Guitar and Orchestra
Cecil Armstrong Gibbs – Threnody
Gordon Jacob 
Concerto No. 2 for Oboe and Orchestra
Sextet for Piano and Wind Quintet
Trio for Violin, Cello and Piano
Variations on "Annie Laurie", for two piccolos, two contrabass clarinets, heckelphone, two contrabassoons, serpent, contrabass serpent, subcontrabass tuba, harmonium and hurdy-gurdy
Michael Tippett
Bonny at Morn (arr. of Northumbrian folksong), unison choir and three recorders
Songs from the British Isles (4), SATB choir
Ralph Vaughan Williams
A Choral Flourish (text from the Psalms), for SATB choir, two trumpets and organ
God Bless the Master of This House, for SATB choir
Preludes on Welsh Folksongs (2), for organ
Symphony No. 8
A Vision of Aeroplanes (text: N. Ezekiel), motet for SATB choir and organ
William Walton – Cello Concerto

Opera
Malcolm Arnold – The Open Window, Op. 56 (opera in one act, libretto by S. Gilliat, after Saki)
Alan Bush – Men of Blackmoor, with libretto by Nancy Bush, premiered at the German National Theatre, Weimar

Film and Incidental music
Malcolm Arnold – 1984, starring Edmond O'Brien, Donald Pleasence, Jan Sterling and Michael Redgrave.
Brian Easdale – The Battle of the River Plate by director-writer team of Michael Powell and Emeric Pressburger, starring John Gregson, Anthony Quayle and Peter Finch.
Edward Williams – Doublecross directed by Anthony Squire, starring Donald Houston, Fay Compton and William Hartnell.

Musical theatre
Grab Me a Gondola by James Gilbert and Julien More, starring Denis Quilley

Musical films
 The Good Companions, starring Eric Portman
 It's a Wonderful World, starring George Cole and featuring Ted Heath and Dennis Lotis
 It's Great to Be Young, starring John Mills and Cecil Parker
 Stars in Your Eyes, starring Nat Jackley and Patricia Kirkwood
 A Touch of the Sun, starring Frankie Howerd, Ruby Murray and Dennis Price

Births
1 January – Andy Gill, guitarist and singer-songwriter
17 January – Paul Young, singer and guitarist
25 January – Andy Cox (The Beat, Fine Young Cannibals)
31 January – Johnny Rotten, singer (Sex Pistols)
12 February – Brian Robertson, Scottish guitarist and songwriter (Thin Lizzy, Motörhead, Wild Horses)
13 February – Peter Hook, singer and bass player (Joy Division, New Order, Freebass, Revenge, Monaco)
12 March  – Steve Harris, musician, composer (Iron Maiden)
3 June – Lynne Dawson, operatic soprano
4 June – Richard Butler, singer-songwriter 
5 July
Terry Chimes, drummer (The Clash, Generation X, Hanoi Rocks, Cowboys International)
Billy Jenkins, guitarist and composer
15 July – Ian Curtis, vocalist (Joy Division) (died 1980)
19 July –Nikki Sudden, English singer-songwriter and guitarist (Jacobites, Swell Maps) (d. 2006)
20 July
Paul Cook, English drummer (Sex Pistols, The Professionals, Chiefs of Relief, Man Raze)
Michael Gordon, American composer
27 August – Glen Matlock, guitarist (Sex Pistols)
12 September – B. A. Robertson, singer-songwriter 
27 October – Hazell Dean, singer
17 November – Philip Grange, composer
19 December – Jimmy Cauty, artist and musician
28 December – Nigel Kennedy, violinist

Deaths
9 March – Amanda Aldridge ('Montague Ring'), opera singer, teacher and composer, 89
16 March – Joseph John Richards, conductor, composer and music teacher, 77
9 April – Jack Little, composer, actor, singer and songwriter
16 May – Orlando Morgan, music teacher, composer and musicologist, 91
18 July – Violet Loraine, musical theatre star, 69
6 September – Felix Borowski, British/American composer and teacher, 84
27 September – Gerald Finzi, composer, 55 ("severe brain inflammation")
18 October – Harry Parry, jazz clarinetist and bandleader, 44
8 December – Edgar Bainton, church music composer, 76
9 December – Ethel Scarborough, pianist and composer, 76
date unknown – George Oldroyd, organist and composer

Awards

Ivor Novello Awards
Best Song Musically and Lyrically – Mátyás Seiber & Norman Newell, "By the Fountains of Rome"

See also 
 1956 in British television
 1956 in the United Kingdom
 List of British films of 1956

References 

 
British Music, 1957 In
British music by year